This is a list of longest rivers of Asia. Included are all rivers over  that are in Asia.

See also
List of rivers of Asia

References

External links

Asia